Jakub Władysław Jarosz (born 10 February 1987) is a Polish professional volleyball player, a former member of the Polish national team, a participant at the Olympic Games London 2012, 2009 European Champion and the 2012 World League winner. At the professional club level, he plays for GKS Katowice.

Personal life
Jakub Jarosz was born in Nysa, Poland. His grandfather and father Maciej are former volleyball players. His brother Marcin was also a volleyball player. On 12 May 2012, he married Agnieszka (née Trzcińska). On 26 August 2013, their first child was born, a son named Kacper. In early 2017, his wife gave birth to their second son Leon.

Career

National team
In 2009, the Polish national volleyball team, including Jarosz, won a title of the European Champions. On 14 September 2009, he was awarded the Knight's Cross of Polonia Restituta. The Order was conferred on the following day by the Prime Minister of Poland, Donald Tusk. With the national team, he won three medals in 2011 – silver at the 2011 World Cup, bronze at the 2011 World League and 2011 European Championship. In 2012, he won a gold medal of the 2012 World League.

Honours

Clubs
 CEV Cup
  2010/2011 – with ZAKSA Kędzierzyn-Koźle
  2012/2013 – with Andreoli Latina
 National championships
 2008/2009  Polish Cup, with PGE Skra Bełchatów
 2008/2009  Polish Championship, with PGE Skra Bełchatów

Youth national team
 2005  CEV U19 European Championship

Individual awards
 2005: CEV U19 European Championship – Most Valuable Player

State awards
 2009:  Knight's Cross of Polonia Restituta

References

External links

 
 Player profile at PlusLiga.pl 
 Player profile at Volleybox.net

1987 births
Living people
People from Nysa, Poland
Sportspeople from Opole Voivodeship
Polish men's volleyball players
Polish Champions of men's volleyball
Olympic volleyball players of Poland
Volleyball players at the 2012 Summer Olympics
Knights of the Order of Polonia Restituta
Polish expatriate sportspeople in Italy
Expatriate volleyball players in Italy
Polish expatriate sportspeople in Qatar
Expatriate volleyball players in Qatar
ZAKSA Kędzierzyn-Koźle players
Skra Bełchatów players
Trefl Gdańsk players
BKS Visła Bydgoszcz players
Resovia (volleyball) players
GKS Katowice (volleyball) players
Opposite hitters
21st-century Polish people